Vavilovo is a rural locality (a village) in Mikhaylovsky Selsoviet, Ufimsky District, Bashkortostan, Russia. The population was 231 as of 2010. There are 10 streets.

Geography 
Vavilovo is located 14 km northwest of Ufa (the district's administrative centre) by road. Mikhaylovka is the nearest rural locality.

References 

Rural localities in Ufimsky District